is a Japanese politician who served as President of the House of Councillors from 2013 to 2016. A member of the Liberal Democratic Party, he has served as a member of the House of Councillors in the National Diet since 1992.

Overview 

A native of Nishitani-mura in Ōno, Fukui, Yamazaki graduated the Nihon University School of Law.

He served in the city assembly of Ōno for one term since 1975 and then in the assembly of Fukui Prefecture for four terms since 1979. He was elected to the House of Councillors for the first time in 1992.

Yamazaki also served as Parliamentary Secretary for Finance (Hashimoto Cabinet), Deputy Secretary-General of LDP, Deputy Chief Cabinet Secretary (Koizumi Cabinet), Secretary-General for the LDP in the House of Councillors.

Toshiaki Yamazaki is his eldest son.

Ideology 
On April 21, 2014 Yamazaki sent a ritual offering to Yasukuni Shrine, with a wooden sign showing "President of the House of Councillors Masaaki Yamazaki" next to the one with "Prime Minister Shinzō Abe".

Like Abe, Yamazaki is in favor of the revision of the constitution.

Both Yamazaki and Abe are affiliated to the openly revisionist lobby Nippon Kaigi, which supports visits and tributes to this controversial shrine, and a restoration of monarchy and militarism.

Yamazaki is a member of the following right-wing Diet groups:
Nippon Kaigi Diet discussion group (日本会議国会議員懇談会 - Nippon kaigi kokkai giin kondankai)
Diet Celebration League of the 20th Anniversary of His Majesty The Emperor's Accession to the Throne (天皇陛下御即位二十年奉祝国会議員連盟)
Conference of parliamentarians on the Shinto Association of Spiritual Leadership (神道政治連盟国会議員懇談会 - Shinto Seiji Renmei Kokkai Giin Kondankai) - NB: SAS a.k.a. Sinseiren, Shinto Political League

Honours
 : Knight Grand Cross of the Order of Orange-Nassau (29 October 2014)

References

External links 
  in Japanese.

Members of the House of Councillors (Japan)
1942 births
Living people
Members of Nippon Kaigi
People from Ōno, Fukui
Politicians from Fukui Prefecture
Liberal Democratic Party (Japan) politicians
Nihon University alumni
Presidents of the House of Councillors (Japan)